Census Division No. 9 (Portage la Prairie) is a census division located within the Central Plains Region of the Province of Manitoba, Canada. Unlike in some other provinces, census divisions do not reflect the organization of local government in Manitoba. These areas exist solely for the purposes of statistical analysis and presentation; they have no government of their own. 

The major service centre of the area is the City of Portage la Prairie. The economic base of the area is agriculture, food processing and manufacturing. The population of the area as of the 2016 census was 24,391. Also included in the division are the Dakota Plains First Nation and the largest portion of the Long Plain First Nation.

Demographics 

Cities

 Portage la Prairie

Unincorporated communities
 Village of St. Claude

Rural municipalities
Grey
Portage la Prairie

First Nations and reserves
 Dakota Plains First Nation (Dakota Plains 6A, Dakota Tipi 1)
 Long Plain First Nation (Long Plain 6, part)

References

External links
 Manitoba Comminity Profiles : Portage la Prairie area

09